Tuomas Kuparinen (born 7 August 1979) is a Finnish former professional footballer who played as a midfielder.

Career
Kuparinen progressed through the Kuusysi youth academy. He would go on to play in Veikkausliiga for 11 seasons, representing Lahti from 1999 to 2000, MYPA in 2001–08 and KuPS in 2009. Kuparinen appeared in a total of 224 first division in his career and scored 21 goals in them. In the 2010 season, he represented KTP, who played in Ykkönen.

Honours
MYPA
 Veikkausliiga: 2005
 Finnish Cup: 2004

References

External links
  Profile at veikkausliiga.com

1979 births
Living people
Finnish footballers
Association football midfielders
Veikkausliiga players
Myllykosken Pallo −47 players
FC Lahti players
Kuopion Palloseura players
Kotkan Työväen Palloilijat players
FC Kuusysi players
Ykkönen players
Sportspeople from Lahti